Joseph Paul Lydon (born 26 November 1963) is an English former professional rugby league footballer who played in the 1980s and 1990s, and coached rugby union in the 2000s and 2010s, and rugby league and rugby union administrator of the 1990s, 2000s and 2010s.

Background
Joe Lydon's birth was registered in Ince-in-Makerfield district, Wigan, Lancashire, England.

Playing career
A Wigan St Patrick's junior, Lydon played first schoolboy curtain-raiser to the Challenge Cup Final at Wembley Stadium in 1975 (the Final drew 85,098 fans). He then signed professional forms with Widnes (who had won the 1975 Challenge Cup Final over Warrington) from Wigan St Patrick's, making his début for the Doug Laughton coaches "Chemics" in a 9–10 defeat by Leigh in 1982. On 23 November 1982, Lydon would later get his first taste of international football when playing in the centres for Widnes at Naughton Park in their 19–6 loss to Australia who were on their undefeated 1982 Kangaroo tour.

In 1983 he made the first of three appearances for the Great Britain Under-24 team against France in January and a month later makes his full Great Britain début, scoring a try and three goals in 20–5 win over France in Carcassonne. In 1984 he won the Lance Todd Trophy as man of the match in Widnes' Wembley win over hometown Wigan, famously scoring two 75-yard interception tries, as well as Man of Steel, Division One Player and Young Player of the Year awards.
 
In 1986, when he joined Wigan, Lydon became rugby league's first £100,000 transfer (based on increases in average earnings, this would be approximately £327,600 in 2013), making his début in a 44–6 win over Hull F.C. During the 1987–88 Rugby Football League season. One of his first games for the Cherry and Whites was against the touring 1986 Australian Kangaroos where he scored a second half try in Wigan's 26–18 defeat by Australia. He played in the centres for defending champions Wigan in their 1987 World Club Challenge victory against the visiting Manly-Warringah Sea Eagles at Central Park. During the game, Manly second rower "Rambo" Ron Gibbs became the first player sent off in a World Club Challenge after a high tackle on Lydon. Later in the game after being tackled by Dale Shearer, the Manly fullback appeared to step on Lydon's head after he had got the ball away to teammate David Stephenson.

Lydon was selected to go on the 1988 Great Britain Lions tour, but his invitation was withdrawn after Lydon allegedly assaulted a spectator.

Lydon was selected to go on the 1992 Great Britain Lions tour of Australia and New Zealand, and collected the last of his 30 GB caps as a substitute in 16–10 defeat by Australia in Brisbane. He made one last appearance for Great Britain, as fullback in their 10–6 loss to Australia in the 1992 Rugby League World Cup Final at Wembley on 24 October. Lydon sprained his ankle early in the match but bravely played on until replaced in the second half by Alan Tait.

He would go on to make one further international appearance, coming on as a replacement for Ireland in their first ever international match, a 24–22 victory against USA in Washington DC in 1995. In 1994 he played the last of 262 games for Wigan as substitute in 30–6 home win over Featherstone Rovers.

During his career Lydon spent two English off-seasons playing in Australia for Sydney's Eastern Suburbs club in 1987, and again in 1989. His first stint at the Roosters was somewhat successful as Easts made it to the Preliminary final before going down to eventual Grand Finalists Canberra. His second stint with the Bondi based club was less successful as Easts finished in 11th place in 1989. Overall Lydon played 22 games for Easts, scoring 8 tries and kicking 14 goals.

Challenge Cup Final appearances
Joe Lydon played left-, scored two tries, and was man of the match winning the Lance Todd Trophy in Widnes' 19–6 victory over Wigan in the 1984 Challenge Cup Final during the 1983–84 season at Wembley Stadium, London on Saturday 5 May 1984, in front of a crowd of 80,116.

County Cup Final appearances
Joe Lydon played , scored a try, and two conversions in Widnes' 8–12 defeat by Barrow in the 1983 Lancashire Cup Final during the 1983–84 season at Central Park, Wigan on Saturday 1 October 1983, played , and scored a try, and a drop goal in Wigan's 15–8 victory over Oldham in the 1986 Lancashire Cup Final during the 1986–87 season at Knowsley Road, St. Helens, on Sunday 19 October 1986, played left- and scored five conversions in the 28–16 victory over Warrington in the 1987 Lancashire Cup Final during the 1987–88 season at Knowsley Road, St. Helens, on Sunday 11 October 1987. played  (replaced by interchange/substitute Ged Byrne) in the 22–17 victory over Salford in the 1988 Lancashire Cup Final during the 1988–89 season at Knowsley Road, St. Helens on Sunday 23 October 1988. and played right- in the 5–4 victory over St. Helens in the 1992 Lancashire Cup Final during the 1992–93 season at Knowsley Road, St. Helens on Sunday 18 October 1992.

John Player Special/Regal Trophy Final appearances
Joe Lydon played left- and scored a try in Widnes' 10–18 defeat by Leeds in the 1983–84 John Player Special Trophy Final during the 1983–84 season at Central Park, Wigan on Saturday 14 January 1984, played right- in Wigan's 18–4 victory over Warrington in the 1986–87 John Player Special Trophy Final during the 1986–87 season at Burnden Park, Bolton on Saturday 10 January 1987, played left- (replaced by interchange/substitute Andy Gregory on 51 minutes) and scored two conversions in the 12–6 victory over Widnes in the 1988–89 John Player Special Trophy Final during the 1988–89 season at Burnden Park, Bolton on Saturday 7 January 1989, played  in the 24–12 victory over Halifax in the 1989–90 Regal Trophy Final during the 1988–89 season at Headingley, Leeds on Saturday 13 January 1990, played as an interchange/substitute, i.e. number 14, (replacing  Martin Offiah on 59 min) in the 15–8 victory over Bradford Northern in the 1992–93 Regal Trophy Final during the 1992–93 season at Elland Road, Leeds on Saturday 23 January 1993, and played  in the 2–33 defeat by Castleford in the 1993–94 Regal Trophy Final during the 1993–94 season at Headingley, Leeds on Saturday 22 January 1994.

After playing
After retiring as a Wigan player, Lydon became the team manager of Wigan – a position he held until 1996. In 1997 Lydon was appointed the RFL's first-ever technical director, a post he held until resigning the post in 2000 when he was appointed manager of the England under-19 rugby union side. He was appointed England Sevens coach in October 2001. In June 2004, he was appointed backs coach for the England rugby union team. In May 2006, after being removed as England backs coach, Lydon turned down the opportunity to join the England RFU Academy.

Joe Lydon also worked as an expert analyst for the BBC alongside former England and Great Britain dual-rugby international Ray French during the 1995 Rugby League World Cup which was held in England.

In July 2007 he began working with Waterloo Rugby Union Club as performance consultant. In August 2007 he was invited to the Rugby league Challenge Cup Final at Wembley Stadium as a guest of honour.

On 24 October 2007, Lydon returned to the Wigan Warriors Club as part of the takeover by Ian Lenagan, and became Chief Executive of the Holding Company.

On 19 November 2008 Joe Lydon was appointed Welsh Rugby Union Head of Rugby Performance & Development.

On 24 May 2013, Joe Lydon was named RFU Head of International Player Development.

Superstars
Joe Lydon participated in the televised all-around sports competition Superstars, finishing second in the 1985 Series.

Player Awards
Only three players have won the Lance Todd Trophy, Harry Sunderland Trophy, and the Man of Steel Award, they are; George Nicholls, Joe Lydon and Paul Wellens.

References

External links
!Great Britain Statistics at englandrl.co.uk (statistics currently missing due to not having appeared for both Great Britain, and England)
Statistics at wigan.rlfans.com
Quins face Leeds in Middlesex Sevens
Lydon's Quins Sevens watch
Commonwealth Games disappointment for Sanderson
Search for "Joe Lydon" at rfu.com
Lydon named WRU's rugby overseer
Search for "Joe Lydon" at bbc.co.uk

1963 births
Living people
English rugby league players
English rugby union coaches
Great Britain national rugby league team players
Lancashire rugby league team players
Lance Todd Trophy winners
Rugby league centres
Rugby league five-eighths
Rugby league fullbacks
Rugby league players from Wigan
Rugby league wingers
Sydney Roosters players
Widnes Vikings players
Wigan Warriors players